Palau Airways Corp. was an airline based in Palau. Their head office was Room #209 in the RMTRI Building in Koror. With the Taiwan branch having been located in Shilin District, Taipei.

Destinations
 
Koror - Roman Tmetuchl International Airport
 
Taipei - Taiwan Taoyuan International Airport

Hong Kong - Hong Kong International Airport

Besides these destinations, the airline also had plans to expand to Japan, South Korea, Philippines and Australia.

History

Beginning 
The airline was founded in 2011 but did not begin their operations until May 6, 2012.

Cease of operations 
After a drop in passengers, Palau Airways shut down on November 11, 2018.

References

Defunct airlines of Palau